Lieutenant General Robin Vaughan Brims,  (born 27 June 1951) is a retired British Army officer. He was Commander of the Field Army at Land Command from 2005 to 2007.

Early life
Brims was born and grew up in Newcastle upon Tyne. He was educated at Winchester College.

Military career
Brims was commissioned into The Light Infantry in 1970. After various military appointments, he took command of the 3rd Battalion The Light Infantry in 1989. He then took up an appointment at the Ministry of Defence, before taking command of 24 Airmobile Brigade in December 1994. He deployed to Bosnia as part of the Allied Rapid Reaction Corps the following year.

Brims went on to be Chief of Staff at Headquarters Northern Ireland in November 1996 and then Director of Plans & Resources in January 1999. He was appointed Commander of the Multi-National Division (South-West) in Bosnia in 2000, after which he became General Officer Commanding 1st (UK) Armoured Division in November 2000, deploying to Iraq in 2003. For his service in Iraq he was awarded the Distinguished Service Order. He became Deputy Chief of Operations at Permanent Joint Headquarters, Northwood, before being deployed as Senior British Military Representative and Deputy Commanding General, Multinational Force, Iraq in April 2005. He became Commander of the Field Army later that year and retired from active duty in January 2008.

Later life
Brims is a Deputy Lieutenant of Tyne and Wear and, in 2017, was High Sheriff of Tyne and Wear.

In October 2021, he was elected a member of the General Synod of the Church of England.

References

External links
 Biography
 College of Arms

|-

|-

|-
 

1951 births
Military personnel of the Bosnian War
Living people
People educated at Winchester College
British Army lieutenant generals
The Light Infantry officers
Companions of the Order of the Bath
Commanders of the Order of the British Empire
Companions of the Distinguished Service Order
Deputy Lieutenants of Tyne and Wear
British Army personnel of the Iraq War
British military leaders of the Iraq War
High Sheriffs of Tyne and Wear
Military personnel from Newcastle upon Tyne
Members of the General Synod of the Church of England